Honnavara is a town in Uttara Kannada district of Karnataka, India.

History
Honnavara is a port town in Coastal Karnataka known for its beautiful landscapes and rich history. The port hosted foreign traders from the Arab world, as well as later from European countries such as Portugal, England and the Netherlands. The 14th century Moroccan traveler Ibn Batutta stopped in the port during his voyage.

Portuguese Rule
During the Portuguese domination a Fortress was built in the 16th century to protect trade in the Indian Ocean. Later in the 18th the English built warehouses at the port.

Transportation

Rail
The Konkan Railway line passes through Honnavara, and its longest bridge is 2.065 km in length and is in Honnavar, over the Sharavati River.

Sea
In October 2013 the Karnataka government announced plans to develop a new port at Honnavar, to be funded by a public–private partnership (PPP) model.

Inland Water
There are proposals for improvements to the Inland Water Transportation system between Honnavara and Gerusoppa along the Sharavati river coast. Also, the Office of Ferries Inspector (Mangalore Circle) that oversees Inland Water Transportation System of the entire coastal belt of Karnataka State is headquartered at Honnavara.

Climate

References 

Cities and towns in Uttara Kannada district
Portuguese Empire